John Crace may refer to: 

John Dibblee Crace (1838–1919), British interior designer 
John Gregory Crace (designer) (1809–1889), British interior designer
Sir John Gregory Crace (1887–1968), British rear admiral 
John Crace (writer) (born 1956), British journalist and critic